Nishat Jubaida FCPS is a Major general and is currently the highest-ranking female officer the Bangladesh Army. She was promoted to the rank of major general on 16 February 2023 as the second female Major general in the Bangladesh Army after Major General Susane Giti.

Career 
General Jubaida is an expert on Medical Microbiology, Transplant Immunology & Immunogenetics. Before promoted to the current rank, Brigadier General Jubaida was the head of Microbiology department of Army Medical College Chittagong. She is the incumbent Commandant of Armed Forces Institute of Pathology (AFIP).

See also
Women in the Bangladesh Army

References 

Living people
Bangladesh Army generals
Female army generals
Sylhet MAG Osmani Medical College alumni